The Nerussa is a river in Oryol and Bryansk Oblasts in Russia. It is a left tributary of the Desna. The river flows through the town of Dmitrovsk.

References 

Rivers of Bryansk Oblast
Rivers of Oryol Oblast